Stephen Fox (1627–1716) was a British politician 

Stephen Fox may also refer to:
Stephen Fox (author) (born 1938), American writer and academic
Stephen Fox (clarinet maker), British clarinetist, saxophonist and clarinet maker
Stephen Fox, 2nd Baron Holland (1745–1774), British politician and peer
Stephen Fox-Strangways, 1st Earl of Ilchester (1704–1776), British peer and Member of Parliament
Stephen Fox, pen name for American screenplay and newspaper writer Jules Furthman (1888–1966)

See also
Steve Fox (disambiguation)
Steven Fox, conductor
Steven Fox (golfer), golfer